The letters CIAU may mean any of the following:
CIAU-FM 103.1, a radio station in Radisson, Quebec
Canadian Interuniversity Athletics Union, now known as U Sports
CIA University, a training facility of the U.S. Central Intelligence Agency